Youth Alliance or Alliance Youth can refer to:

Alliance Youth, a liberal political party youth wing in Northern Ireland
Alliance Youth, a ministry of The Christian and Missionary Alliance
Conference Youth Alliance, a youth association football competition in England
European Free Alliance Youth, the youth wing of the European Free Alliance European political party
European Youth Alliance,  a short-lived alliance of fascist national youth organizations
Football League Youth Alliance, a youth association football competition in England
Liberal Alliance Youth, a liberal political party youth wing in Denmark
National Youth Alliance, an American former right-wing political group
Socialist Youth Alliance, a former leftist youth movement in Portugal
Revolutionary Youth Alliance, a far-left political youth movement in Brazil
Zimbabwe Youth in Alliance, a political party in Zimbabwe